The Norrbotten Regiment, designation I 19, is a Swedish Army arctic armoured, light infantry and commando regiment that traces its origins back to the 19th century. The regiment's soldiers were originally recruited from the province of Norrbotten, and it is currently garrisoned in Boden, Norrbotten. The regiment has the responsibility for training two armoured and one special recon battalion, as well as number of Arctic light infantry battalions from the home guard as well as running the army's winter unit.

As of 2018, the Norrbotten Regiment employs 489 professional officers, 402 full-time soldiers, 512 part-time soldiers, 116 civilians and 683 reserve officers.

History 

The regiment was created in 1841 when Västerbotten Field Jäger Regiment was split into two corps units of battalion size, one of them being Norrbotten Field Jäger Corps. The unit was upgraded to regimental size and renamed Norrbotten Regiment in 1892. The regiment had its training grounds at various places in Norrbotten, but was eventually garrisoned in Boden in 1907. A ski battalion was created in 1910, and in 1943 this ski battalion was split off from the regiment, later becoming The Army Ranger School and in 1975 Lapland Ranger Regiment.

The regiment merged with the Norrbotten Armoured Battalion (P 5) in 1975 to form Norrbotten Regiment with Norrbotten Armoured Battalion, designated I 19/P 5. For a short time in the 1990s, the unit was then merged with the wartime-organised Norrbotten Brigade, and designated MekB 19. In 2000, the unit was reorganised once again, and was redesignated back to its old designation I 19 despite being an armoured regiment, the name was also changed back to Norrbotten Regiment.

Organisation 

1841
Life company
Piteå Company
Kalix Company
Råneå Company

2000
Norrbotten Armoured Battalion
Norrland Artillery Battalion
Norrland Engineer Battalion
Norrland Air Defence Battalion
Norrland Signal Battalion

2007
Norrbotten Armoured Battalion
Army Ranger Battalion
 Lappland Ranger Group
 Norrbotten Group
 Västerbotten Group 
 Field Ranger Group
 West Norrland Group
 Försvarsmaktens vinterenhet (Armed Forces Winter Unit)
The current organisation of the regiment includes:

 Regimental Headquarters, in Boden
 3rd Brigade Staff
 Norrbotten Armoured Battalion
 Army Ranger Battalion, in Arvidsjaur
 Swedish Armed Forces Winter Unit

Heraldry and traditions

Colours, standards and guidons
The Norrbotten Regiment presents one regimental colour, three battalion colours and two battalion standards:

Colour of Norrbotten Regiment
On 31 August 1974, the regiment was presented with a new colour by His Majesty the King Gustaf VI Adolf in connection with the 350th anniversary of the regiment. When the Norrbotten Armoured Battalion (P 5) was amalgamated with the regiment, its standard was carried to the side of the regimental colour. The standard is carried again by the Norrbotten Armoured Battalion since 1 July 2000.

A new colour was presented to the regiment in Boden by His Majesty the King Carl XVI Gustaf on 27 August 2001. The colour is drawn by Kristina Holmgård-Åkerberg and embroidered by machine and hand in insertion technique by Maj-Britt Salander/company Blå Kusten. Blazon: "On blue cloth powdered with yellow estoiles, the provincial badge of Västerbotten; a white reindeer at speed, armed and langued red. On a white border at the upper side of the colour, battle honours (Landskrona 1677, Düna 1701, Kliszow 1702, Fraustadt 1706, Malatitze 1708, Strömstad 1717) in blue and close to the staff the provincial badge of Lappland; a red savage with green garlands on head and around loins, clutching a yellow club on right shoulder (a legacy from the former Lappland Brigade, NB 20).

A new colour was presented to the regiment in Boden by His Majesty the King Carl XVI Gustaf on 7 September 2019. The colour is drawn by Henrik Dahlström, heraldic artist and graphic designer at the State Herald at the National Archives of Sweden. The colour was made by Friends of Handicraft in Stockholm, which is a subcontractor to the Swedish Army Museum. Pre- and post-work as well as embroidery work were done by Viola Edin and Anna Eriksson at company . The wild man in red (I 20's coat of arms) that was to the left of the battle honours in the old colour has been removed, as the Västerbotten Group, that carry those traditions, from 2020 belongs to Northern Military Region with the Västerbotten Group in Umeå.

Colour of Norrland Artillery Battalion
The colour is drawn by Kristina Holmgård-Åkerberg and embroidered by machine in insertion technique by Sofie Thorburn. The colour was presented to the battalion in Kristinehamn by His Majesty the King Carl XVI Gustaf on 15 April 2002. The colour may be used according to the decisions of CO I 19. Blazon: "On blue cloth in the centre the lesser coat of arms of Sweden, three yellow crowns placed two and one. In the first corner the town badge of Boden; a white wall with a gatetower embattled (the original name of the battalion was Boden Artillery Regiment, A 8), in the second corner two crossed yellow gunbarrels of older pattern, in the third corner the provincial badge of Västerbotten, a white reindeer at speed, armed red (a legacy from the former Norrbotten Artillery Corps, A 5) and in the fourth corner the provincial badge of Jämtland, a white elk passant, attacked on its back by a rising falcon and in the front by a rampant dog, both yellow; all animals armed red (a legacy from the former Norrland Artillery Regiment, A 4)."

Colour of Norrland Engineer Battalion
The colour is drawn by Kristina Holmgård-Åkerberg and embroidered by machine and hand (the badge) in insertion technique by the company Libraria. The colour was presented to the then Norrland Engineer Battalion in Boden by His Majesty the King Carl XVI Gustaf on 27 August 2001. The colour may be used according to the decisions of CO I 19. Blazon: "On blue cloth in the centre the lesser coat of arms of Sweden, three yellow crowns placed two and one. In the first corner a mullet with a cluster of rays, all in yellow. In the lower part of this the coat of arms of the unit; argent, throughout a wall with a gatetower both embattled gules (the original name of the battalion was Royal Boden Engineers Regiment, Ing 3); on a chief azure three open crowns in fess or (a legacy from the former Svea Engineer Regiment, Ing 1). The shield ensigned with a royal crown proper.

Colour of Norrland Signal Battalion
The colour is drawn by Brita Grep and embroidered by hand in insertion technique by the company Libraria. The colour was presented to the then Royal Norrland Signal Battalion (S 3) in Boden by His Majesty King Gustaf VI Adolf on 7 July 1961. It was used as regimental colour by S 3 until 1 July 2000. The colour may be used according to the decisions of CO I 19. Blazon: "On blue cloth in the centre the lesser coat of arms of Sweden, three yellow crowns placed two and one. In the first corner a mullet with a cluster of rays, all yellow. In the lower part of this placed upon a cluster of yellow bolts, the provincial coat of arms of Västerbotten; azure powdered with estoiles or, a reindeer at speed argent armed and langued gules. The shield ensigned with a royal crown proper."

Standard of Norrland Air Defence Battalion
The standard is drawn by Brita Grep and embroidered by hand in insertion technique by the Kedja studio, Heraldica. The standard was presented to the then Royal Luleå Anti-Aircraft Corps (Lv 7) in Luleå by the military commander of the VI Military District, major general Nils Rosenblad in 1943. It was used as regimental standard by Lv 7 until 1 July 2000. The standard may be used according to the decisions of CO I 19. Blazon: "On blue cloth in the centre the lesser coat of arms of Sweden, three open yellow crowns placed two and one. In the first corner the town badge of Luleå ; two white keys, the left inverted (the original name of the battalion was Luleå Anti-Aircraft Corps). In the other corners two winged yellow gunbarrels of older pattern in saltire. Yellow fringe."

Standard of Norrbotten Armoured Battalion
The standard is drawn by Brita Grep and embroidered by hand in insertion technique by Libraria. The standard was presented to the former Royal Norrbotten Armoured Battalion (P 5) in Boden by His Majesty the King Gustaf VI Adolf on 28 July 1961. It was used as battalion standard until 1975 and then as a traditional standard at I 19 up to 1 July 2000. The standard may be used according to the decisions of CO I 19. Blazon: "On blue cloth powdered with yellow estoiles the provincial badge of Västerbotten; a white reindeer at speed, armed and langued red. Blue fringe."

Coat of arms
The coat of the arms of the Norrbotten Regiment (I 19) 1977–1994. Blazon: "Azure, powdered with estoiles or, the provincial badge of Västerbotten, a reindeer courant argent, armed and langued gules. The shield surmounted two muskets in saltire or." The coat of arms of the Norrbotten Armoured Battalion (P 5) 1957–1975 and the Norrbotten Regiment and Norrbotten Brigade (NMekB 19) 1994–2000. Blazon: "Azure, powdered with estoiles or, the provincial badge of Västerbotten, a reindeer courant argent, armed and langued gules. The shield surmounted two arms in fess, embowed and vambraced, the hands holding swords in saltire, or". The coat of the arms of the Norrbotten Regiment (I 19) since 2000. Blazon: "Azure, powdered with estoiles or, the provincial badge of Västerbotten, a reindeer courant argent, armed gules".

Medals
The medal ribbon is of blue moiré with a yellow stripe on the middle followed on each side by a black line and a white stripe.

Other
When the Lapland Brigade (NB 20) was disbanded on 31 December 1997, Norrbotten Regiment took over its traditions and colour, which should not be mixed with the colour and traditions of Västerbotten Regiment, which were transferred on 1 July 2000 to the Västerbotten Group. In addition to the traditional heritage of the Lapland Brigade, the regiment also has primarily traditional heritage from Norrbotten Regiment with Norrbotten Armoured Battalion (I 19/P 5), Norrbotten Regiment and Norrbotten Brigade (MekB 19), Norrbotten Armoured Battalion (P 5) and Norrland Dragoon Regiment (K 4).

Commanding officers
Regimental commanders active from 1900. For regimental commanders active from 1994 to 2000, see Norrbotten Regiment and Norrbotten Brigade

Commanders

1899–1904: Axel Otto Fredrik von Arbin
1904–1907: Colonel Lars Tingsten
1907–1908: Constantin Fallenius
1908–1911: Carl Greger Leijonhufvud
1911–1916: Conrad August Falkenberg
1916–1921: Gabriel Hedenberg
1921–1924: Erik Nordenskjöld
1924–1927: Erik Grafström
1928–1934: Colonel Ivar Holmquist
1934–1937: Gustaf Adolf Miles Mauritz Hahr
1937–1942: Sven Ramström
1942–1946: Colonel Nils Björk
1946–1947: Colonel Nils Swedlund
1947–1951: Lars Petrus Lande
1951–1958: Arne G:son Hallström
1958–1961: Colonel Karl Gustaf Brandberg
1961–1963: Olof Rudqvist
1963–1965: Seth Kristian Andrae
1965–1966: Colonel Karl Eric Holm
1966–1971: Bror Bertil Matteus Jansson
1971–1973: Ingemar Grunditz
1973–1984: Jan Wickbom
1984–1986: Colonel Sven-Åke Jansson
1986–1988: Bo Pellnäs
1988–1993: Göran Honkamaa
1994–2000: See Norrbotten Regiment and Norrbotten Brigade
2000–2003: Per Lodin
2003–2004: Ola Hansson
2004–2006: Frank Westman
2006–2010: Jan Mörtberg
2010–2014: Olof Granander
2014–2017: Mikael Frisell
2018–2018: Ulf Siverstedt
2018–2021: Jonny Lindfors
2021–present: Nils Johansson

Deputy commanders
1973–1976: Ulf Ling-Vannérus

Names, designations and locations

See also
List of Swedish regiments

Footnotes

References

Notes

Print

Web

Further reading

External links

 

Infantry regiments of the Swedish Army
Armored regiments of the Swedish Army
Military units and formations established in 1841
Military units and formations disestablished in 1994
Military units and formations established in 2000
1841 establishments in Sweden
1994 disestablishments in Sweden
2000 establishments in Sweden
Boden Garrison